Mulgirigala Archaeological Museum is a site museum located at Mulkirigala, Sri Lanka. It was maintained by Department of Archaeology of Sri Lanka.

The museum is used to exhibit archaeological objects found in Mulkirigala and surrounding area. It contains collection of rare stuff such as Palm-leaf manuscripts, tools, old reports and paintings.

See also 
 List of museums in Sri Lanka

References 

Museums in Hambantota District
Buildings and structures in Tangalle